A varus deformity is an excessive inward angulation (medial angulation, that is, towards the body's midline) of the distal segment of a bone or joint.  The opposite of varus is called valgus.  EX: Varus deformity results in a decreased Q angle of the knee joint.

The terms varus and valgus always refer to the direction that the distal segment of the joint points.

For example, in a valgus deformity of the knee, the distal part of the leg below the knee is deviated outward, in relation to the femur, resulting in a knock-kneed appearance.  Conversely, a varus deformity at the knee results in a bowlegged  with the distal part of the leg deviated inward, in relation to the femur.  However, in relation to the mid-line of the body, the knee joint is deviated towards the mid-line.  EX: Valgus deformity results in an increased Q angle of the knee joint.

Terminology
The terminology is made confusing by the etymology of these words. 
 The terms varus and valgus are both Latin, but confusingly, their Latin meanings conflict with their current usage. In current usage, as noted above, a varus deformity of the knee describes bowed legs, but in the original Latin, varus meant "knock-kneed." Similarly, while a valgus deformity of the knee would currently describe knocked knees, the original Latin meaning was "bow-legged"
 Application of these words in adjectival form to other portions of the body by the medical community has resulted in their definitions changing so that they now refer to the angle of the distal segment (i.e. valgus impaction in a Garden I femoral neck fracture).
 It is correct for a knock-kneed deformity to be called both a varus deformity at the hip (coxa vara) and a valgus deformity at the knee (genu valgum); although the common terminology is to simply refer to it as a valgus knee.

When the terminology refers to a bone rather than a joint, the distal segment of the bone is being described.  Thus, a varus deformity of the tibia (i.e. a mid-shaft tibial fracture with varus deformity) refers to the distal segment in a varus alignment compared to the proximal segment.

Examples
 Hip: coxa vara —  the angle between the head and the shaft of the femur is reduced, resulting in a limp.
 Knee: genu varum (from Latin genu = knee) — the tibia is turned inward in relation to the femur, resulting in a bowlegged deformity.
 Ankle: talipes varus (from Latin talus = ankle and pes = foot). A notable subtype is clubfoot or talipes equinovarus, which is where one or both feet are rotated inwards and downwards.
 Toe: hallux varus (Latin hallux = big toe) — inward deviation of the big toe away from the second toe.
 Elbows: cubitus varus (Latin cubitus = elbow) — turned inward elbows

See also
 Valgus deformity

References

External links 

 Canale & Beaty: Campbell's Operative Orthopaedics, 11th ed. - 2007 - Mosby, An Imprint of Elsevier

Skeletal disorders
Medical signs
Arthropathies